Listed below are the current buildings of the Perelman School of Medicine, not including those of any of the affiliated hospitals.

References 

Perelman School of Medicine at the University of Pennsylvania
Perelman School of Medicine
Perelman